Qoussair, El Kuseir, is a village in the  Marjeyoun District in South Lebanon.

Name
According to E. H. Palmer, the name Kuseir means  "the little palace."

History
In 1881, the PEF's Survey of Western Palestine  (SWP) described it: "A village, built of stone, containing about 300 Metawileh, situated on ridge of hill, surrounded by gardens of figs and olives, and by arable land. Water is obtained from rock-cut cisterns, and
running water in the Wady el Hajeir." They further noted: "There are three caves and a lintel now in use in the village, with a Greek inscription. There are remains of vaults, and the modern houses are built of ancient materials ; several rock-cut cisterns."

References

Bibliography

External links 
  Aadchit (Qoussair), Localiban
Survey of Western Palestine, Map 2:   IAA, Wikimedia commons

Populated places in Marjeyoun District
Shia Muslim communities in Lebanon